Roland Aboujaoudé (7 September 1930 – 2 May 2019) was a Lebanese Catholic Maronite eparch of the Maronite Catholic Patriarchate of Antioch.

Life
Roland Aboujaoudé was born on 7 September 1930 in Jal-Edib, Lebanon. He was ordained priest on 25 April 1959. On 12 July 1975, Aboujaoudé was appointed patriarchal vicar of Antioch and titular bishop of Arca in Phoenicia dei Maroniti. He was ordained bishop on 23 August 1975 by the hands of the Maronite Patriarch of Antioch Cardinal Anthony Peter Khoraish and his co-consecrators were Elie Farah, Archeparch of Cyprus and Joseph Merhi, MLM, Eparch of Cairo.

On 1985 Aboujaoudé was appointed Vicar general of Antioch till 1988 when he was appointed auxiliary bishop of Antioch.

Since 1997 he had been a Curial Bishop and Protosyncellus of the Maronite Patriarch.

On 6 June 2011, he presented his resignation from the post of auxiliary bishop and it was accepted by Pope Benedict XVI.

Co-consecrator bishop
Roland Aboujaoudé was co-consecrator in episcopal ordinations of following bishops:

 Paul Fouad Tabet, titular bishop "pro hac vice" of Sinna (Apostolic Nuncio)
 Elias Shaheen, Eparch of Montréal
 Khalil Abi-Nader, Archeparch of Beirut
 Joseph Mohsen Béchara, Archeparch of Cyprus
 Abdallah Bared, titular bishop of Tarsus dei Maroniti and auxiliary bishop of Antioch
 Antoine Torbey, Eparch of Latakia
 Paul-Emile Saadé, titular bishop of Apamea in Syria dei Maroniti as auxiliary bishop in Antioch
 Bechara Boutros al-Rahi, OMM, Titular Bishop of Caesarea Philippi and auxiliary bishop of Antioch
 Philippe Boutros Chebaya, Eparch of Baalbek
 Pierre Callaos, Archeparch of Aleppo
 Guy-Paul Noujaim, titular bishop of Caesarea Philippi and auxiliary bishop of Antioch
 Joseph Mahfouz, OLM, Eparch of São Paulo
 Charbel Georges Merhi, CML, Eparch of Buenos Aires
 Francis Némé Baïssari, titular bishop of Aradus and auxiliary bishop of Antioch
 Paul Youssef Matar, titular bishop of Tarsus dei Maroniti and auxiliary bishop of Antioch
 Maroun Khoury Sader, Archeparch of Tyre
 Gabriel Toubia, Archeparch of Tripoli
 Joseph Khoury, titular bishop of Chonochora and auxiliary bishop of Antioch
 Paul-Mounged El-Hachem, Eparch of Baalbek
 Pierre Wadih Tayah, Eparch of Mexico
 Paul Nabil El-Sayah, Archeparch of Haifa and the Holy Land
 Tanios El Khoury, Eparch of Sidon
 Youhanna Fouad El-Hage, Archeparch of Tripoli
 Robert Joseph Shaheen, Eparch of Los Angeles
 Massoud Massoud, Eparch of Latakia
 Ad Abi Karam, Eparch of Sydney
 Mansour Hobeika, Eparch of Zahle
 Georges Saad Abi Younes, OLM, Eparch of Mexico
 Chucrallah-Nabil El-Hage, Archeparch of Tyre
 Gregory John Mansour, Eparch of Brooklyn
 Georges Bou-Jaoudé, CM, Archeparch of Tripoli
 Simon Atallah, OAM, Eparch of Baalbek
 François Eid, OMM, Eparch of Cairo
 Elias Nassar, Eparch of Sidon

References

External links
 http://www.catholic-hierarchy.org/bishop/babouj.html 

1930 births
2019 deaths
Lebanese clergy
20th-century Maronite Catholic bishops
21st-century Maronite Catholic bishops